The Dano-Swedish War of 1657–1658, known in Denmark as the First Karl Gustav War in Norway as Krabbes Feud and in Sweden as Karl Gustav's First Danish War, was a conflict between Sweden and Denmark–Norway during the Second Northern War. In 1657, Charles X of Sweden and his Swedish army were bogged down in Poland. Frederick III of Denmark-Norway saw an opportunity to recover the territories lost in 1645 and attacked Sweden. The outbreak of war with Denmark provided Charles with an excuse to withdraw from the Polish campaign and move against Denmark.

 A harsh winter had forced the Dano-Norwegian fleet into port, and froze the Great Belt and Little Belt straits. After entering Jutland from the south, a Swedish army of 7,000 battle-hardened veterans marched across the icy Little Belt onto the Danish island of Funen on 30 January 1658. The Swedes captured the island of Funen within a few days and then sent on to capture the islands of Langeland, Lolland, and Falster. The Swedish army continued to Zealand, threatening the Danish capital of Copenhagen. The rapid Swedish attack across the frozen Belts was completely unexpected; Frederick III considered meeting the Swedish army in battle, but his advisors thought this was too risky and instead Denmark-Norway signed the very harsh Treaty of Roskilde on 26 February 1658.

Sweden had won its most prestigious victory, and Denmark-Norway had suffered its most costly defeat. Denmark-Norway yielded the Danish provinces of Scania, Halland, Blekinge and the island of Bornholm and the Norwegian provinces Bohuslen and Trondhjem len (Trøndelag and Nordmøre) to Sweden. Halland had already been under Swedish control since the signing of the Treaty of Brömsebro in 1645, but it now became Swedish territory permanently.

See also
Swedish Empire
Treaty of Roskilde
Denmark-Norway

References

Second Northern War
Northern Wars
Wars involving Denmark
Wars involving Norway
Wars involving Sweden
Conflicts in 1657
Conflicts in 1658
1657 in Denmark
1658 in Denmark
Denmark–Sweden relations
1657 in Sweden
1658 in Sweden